XHNQ-FM is a radio station in Acapulco, Guerrero, Mexico on 99.3 FM. It is owned by MVS Radio and carries the Exa FM format.

References

1976 establishments in Mexico
Radio stations established in 1976
Radio stations in Guerrero
Spanish-language radio stations
Contemporary hit radio stations in Mexico
MVS Radio